Proserpina (minor planet designation: 26 Proserpina) is a main-belt asteroid discovered by German astronomer R. Luther on May 5, 1853. It is named after the Roman goddess Proserpina, the daughter of Ceres and the Queen of the Underworld. Another main-belt asteroid, 399 Persephone, discovered in 1895, is named after her Greek counterpart.

This object is orbiting the Sun with a period of 4.33 years. It has a cross-section size of around 90 km and a stony (S-type) composition. Photometric observations of this asteroid have produced discrepant estimates of the rotation period. A period of 12.13 hours was reported in 1979, followed by 10.6 hours in 1981 and 6.67 hours in 2001. Observations made in 2007 at the Oakley Observatory in Terre Haute, Indiana produced a light curve with a period of 13.06 ± 0.03 hours and a brightness variation of 0.21 ± 0.01 in magnitude. This was refined by a 2008 study, giving a period of 13.110 ± 0.001 hours.

References

External links 
 
 

000026
000026
000026
Discoveries by Robert Luther
Named minor planets
18530505
Proserpina